Cooper's Cave is a series of fossil-bearing breccia filled cavities.

History of investigations
Cooper's Cave is now recognised as the fifth richest hominid site in the Cradle of Humankind World Heritage Site (behind Sterkfontein, Swartkrans, Drimolen and Kromdraai) and one of the richest sites for early hominid stone tools of the Developed Olduwan culture. Excavations are still underway at Cooper's and are currently being directed by Christine Steininger and Lee Berger of the Institute for Human Evolution and the Bernard Price Institute for Palaeontological Research at the University of the Witwatersrand.

Tools
Cooper's Cave has provided a rich tool assemblage that has been provisionally assigned to the Developed Olduwan. Cooper's is arguably the second richest early stone tool site in the Cradle of Humankind area.

Geology
Cooper's is a series of breccia-filled dolomitic caves that formed in fissures along geological faults.

Age of the deposits
Cooper's D has been dated by uranium-lead methods (Robyn Pickering, U. Melbourne) to between 1.5 and 1.4 million years ago. Cooper's A, based on the animals recovered, is thought to be about the same age.

Gallery

References

External links

 Prof. Lee Berger: Coopers Cave

Archaeological sites in South Africa
Caves of South Africa
Landforms of Gauteng
Limestone caves
Paleoanthropological sites
Pliocene
South African heritage sites
Archaeological sites of Southern Africa